Qarah Bolagh (also Romanized as Qarah Bolāgh) is a village in Chaharduli Rural District, in the Central District of Asadabad County, Hamadan Province, Iran. At the 2006 census, its population was 592, in 138 families.

References 

Populated places in Asadabad County